Ørnulf Opdahl (born 5 January 1944) is a Norwegian painter and educator. He was born in Ålesund. He is represented in several art collections, including the National Gallery of Norway, Bergen Art Museum and the Astrup Fearnley Museum of Modern Art. He was appointed professor at the Norwegian National Academy of Fine Arts from 1985 to 1992.

References

1944 births
Living people
People from Ålesund
20th-century Norwegian painters
21st-century Norwegian painters
Academic staff of the Oslo National Academy of the Arts